A Storm in Summer is a 2000 American made-for-television drama film directed by Robert Wise and starring Peter Falk, Andrew McCarthy, Nastassja Kinski and Ruby Dee. It is the last film to be directed by Wise. Rod Serling first wrote the original script in 1970 and the filmmakers re-used the same one for this production. Serling's script was posthumously honored with an Emmy nomination and a Writers Guild Award.

Producer Renee Valente won a Daytime Emmy in 2001 for her work on the film.

Cast
Peter Falk as Abel Shaddick
Andrew McCarthy as Stanley
Nastassja Kinski as Gloria Ross
Aaron Meeks as Herman D. Washington
Ruby Dee as Grandmother
Gillian Barber as Mrs. Parker
Lillian Carlson as Mrs. Gold
Keith Martin Gordey as Cop
Ingrid Torrance as Harriet
Ty Olsson as Biker

References

External links
 
 

2000 television films
2000 films
2000 drama films
Films directed by Robert Wise
Films with screenplays by Rod Serling
American drama television films
Showtime (TV network) films
2000s American films